Francine McDougall is an Australian film director, film producer, photographer, television director, television producer and screenwriter. She is best known for directing the 2001 comedy film Sugar & Spice, her feature film directorial debut. She also directed the Disney Channel Original Movies Go Figure (2005) and Cow Belles (2006).

Life and career 

McDougall grew up in Sydney, Australia. In 1996, she directed the short film Pig!, a film that won a Sundance Film Festival award for best short film. In the next year she directed another short film entitled The Date starring Marla Sokoloff. From 2008 to 2010, McDougall was one of frequent directors of the Playhouse Disney series Imagination Movers.

She is also an accomplished photographer with her official website showcasing much of her work. She currently lives in Los Angeles.

Credits

References

External links 
 
 

Australian film directors
Australian film producers
Australian screenwriters
Australian photographers
Australian television directors
Australian emigrants to the United States
Australian women film directors
Australian women screenwriters
Australian women television directors
Living people
People from Sydney
Year of birth missing (living people)
Australian women photographers